George Frederick Hodgins (December 17, 1865 – January 17, 1940) was a merchant and political figure in Quebec. He represented Pontiac in the House of Commons of Canada from 1908 to 1911 as a Liberal.

He was born in Shawville, Canada East and was educated at the Shawville Academy. In 1890, he married Georgina Thomas. He was president of the Shawville Milling Company. He also served as chairman of the local school board. He ran unsuccessfully for a seat in the House of Commons in 1904. Hodgins was defeated by Gerald Hugh Brabazon when he ran for reelection in 1911. He died in Ottawa at the age of 74.

References

Members of the House of Commons of Canada from Quebec
Liberal Party of Canada MPs
1865 births
1940 deaths